Edmond Miles (born July 6, 1984) is a former American football linebacker. He was signed by the Miami Dolphins as an undrafted free agent in 2007. He played college football at Iowa.

Miles played 18 games with the Dolphins and the New York Giants before signing as a free agent with the Atlanta Falcons in 2009. He was released from the Falcons on August 25, 2009.

After his NFL career he currently coaches the Cedar Rapids Jefferson J-Hawks football team.

References

External links
Iowa Hawkeyes bio
New York Giants bio

1984 births
Living people
Players of American football from Tallahassee, Florida
American football linebackers
Iowa Hawkeyes football players
Miami Dolphins players
New York Giants players
Atlanta Falcons players